The late 1970s saw a concerted effort on the part of Gay Rights activists, the French feminist organization Choisir, and Leftist Intellectuals to not only equalize the age of consent but rethink or abolish the concept altogether. In 1977, a petition was addressed to the French parliament calling for the abrogation of several articles of the age of consent law. The laws were considered an infringement on adolescent sexual autonomy. The primary argument behind the petition was the disparity in age of consent created by a previous piece of legislation, which made heterosexual sex legal at the age of 15, but prohibited sodomy and similar acts until age 18. 

A number of French intellectuals—including Michel Foucault, Gilles Deleuze, Jacques Derrida, Louis Aragon, Roland Barthes, Simone de Beauvoir, Jean-Paul Sartre, Félix Guattari, Michel Leiris, Alain Robbe-Grillet, Philippe Sollers, Jacques Rancière, Jean-François Lyotard, Francis Ponge,  and various prominent doctors and psychologists—signed the petition. The same year, Michel Foucault presented to the Commission for the Revision of the Penal Code to equalize and lower the age of consent to 13. In 1977 and 1979 two open letters were published in French newspapers defending individuals arrested under charges of statutory rape, in the context of reformation of age of consent laws.

Background

In 1945, an ordinance was enacted by the French government that established an age of consent in France of 15. However, an article within this ordinance forbade sodomy and similar "sexual relations against nature" with any person under the age of 21. In 1974, this was lowered to 18. This was perceived by activists, including Michel Foucault and Guy Hocquenghem, as being discriminatory against gay men.

Michel Foucault argued that it is intolerable to assume that a minor is incapable of giving meaningful consent to sexual relations. Foucault also believed consent, as a concept, was a "contractual notion", and that it was not a sufficient measure of whether harm was being conducted  Foucault, Sartre, and newspapers such as Libération and Le Monde each defended the idea of sexual relationships with minors.

The petition

Michel Foucault stated that the petition was signed by himself, by the novelist/gay activist Guy Hocquenghem, the actor/play-writer/jurist Jean Danet, pediatrician and child psychoanalyst Françoise Dolto and also by people belonging to a wide range of political positions.

The main body of the text calls for the end of discrimination against homosexual men encoded in the 1945 ordinance. It then calls for a commission called the Commission de Révision du Code Pénal (Penal Code Revision Commission) to review the age of consent and recommend changes to parliament. The petition also explicitly addresses the 'Affaire de Versailles', where three adult men, Dejager (age 45), Gallien (age 43), and Burckhardt (age 39) had sexual intercourse with minors from both genders aged 12-13. 

On April 4, 1978, a conversation detailing the reasons for their positions was broadcast by radio France Culture in the program "Dialogues". The participants, Michel Foucault, Jean Danet and Guy Hocquenghem, had all signed the 1977 petition, along with other intellectuals. They argued the idea of legal consent is a contractual notion and a "trap", saying that "no one makes a contract before making love".

Publication of open letters

An open letter signed by 69 people, including Jean-Paul Sartre, Michel Foucault, Gilles Deleuze, Roland Barthes, Philippe Sollers, and Louis Aragon was published in Le Monde in 1977, on the eve of the trial of three Frenchmen (Bernard Dejager, Jean-Claude Gallien, and Jean Burckardt) all accused of having sex with 12- and 13-year-old girls and boys. Two of them had then been in temporary custody since 1973 and the letter referred to this fact as scandalous. The letter claimed there was a disproportion between the qualification of their acts as a crime and the nature of the reproached acts, and also a contradiction since adolescents in France were fully responsible for their acts  from the age of 13. The text also opined that if 13-year-old girls in France had the right to receive the pill, then they also should be able to consent, arguing for the right of "13- and 12-year-olds" "to have relations with whomever they choose."

A similar letter was published in the paper Libération in 1979, supporting Gérard R., an accused child sex criminal awaiting his trial for eighteen months, signed by 63 persons, stating that Gérard R. lived with young girls aged 6 to 12 and that they were happy with the situation. The letter was later reproduced in the paper L'Express, in the issue of March 7, 2001.

Legacy

In 1982, the French government removed its clauses regarding sodomy and similar acts "against nature" from the 1945 ordinance.

See also
 Age of consent reform (UK)
Paedophile Information Exchange

References

Political history of France
Age of consent
Sex laws
Law of France
Pedophile advocacy
Petitions
1977 in France
1977 documents